Under A Dark Sky is a progressive rock album by Uli Jon Roth, featuring Mark Boals and Liz Vandall on vocals. It marks the first official release in the long-awaited series of Symphonic Legends, which is a cycle of music written for Roth's all-encompassing Sky of Avalon project.

Mark Boals has stated in an interview that the next installment is planned for the near future, and that he will appear in it.

Andy DiGelsomina, composer of the heavy metal opera Lyraka, calls it "the most relevant rock guitar album of the 21st century...it takes as its base the pioneering progressive rock of the 70s, and with the lead guitar in (Roth)'s hands, ups the expressive content of the compositions to a heretofore unrealized degree. Roth's guitar becomes like a separate voice, a vital protagonist in an apocalyptic opera.".

Track listing

References

External links
KvltSite review of Under a Dark Sky

2008 albums
Uli Jon Roth albums